Kiyomi Iwata (born 1941) is a Japanese-American textile artist known for her sculptural use of textiles.  Born in Kobe, Japan, she emigrated to the United States in 1961. Her work is included in the collections of the Smithsonian American Art Museum, the Virginia Museum of Fine Arts, the Fine Arts Museums of San Francisco and the Metropolitan Museum of Art, New York.

References

1941 births
Living people
Artists from Hyōgo Prefecture
20th-century women textile artists
20th-century textile artists
21st-century women textile artists
21st-century textile artists
20th-century Japanese women artists
21st-century Japanese women artists
20th-century Japanese artists
21st-century Japanese artists
People from Kobe